Vicálvaro is a district in the southeast of Madrid, Spain. It is named after the former municipality absorbed into the municipality of Madrid in 1951.

History
When Spain's Civil Guard was established in 1844, the first headquarters of its cavalry was in Vicálvaro. Franco converted it into an artillery barracks for the Brunete Armored Division, Regiment No. 11. The building is now part of the Rey Juan Carlos University.

Vicálvaro was the site of Leopoldo O'Donnell's 1854 coup known as La Vicalvarada, which began Spain's Bienio progresista.

In 2011, a Visigothic necropolis was uncovered in Vicálvaro.

Geography

Position
VIcálvaro is bordered on the west by the district of Moratalaz (across the Autopista de Circunvalación M-40), on the north by San Blas (across the M-40, the Avenida de Canillejas a Vicálvaro, the Autopista Radial 3 and the Vicálvaro-Coslada Highway), on the south by the Puente de Vallecas and the Villa de Vallecas (across Autovía A-3) and on the east by the municipalities of Coslada, San Fernando de Henares and Rivas-Vaciamadrid.

Subdivision
Since 2017, the district is formed by 4 neighborhoods: Casco Histórico de Vicálvaro, Valderrivas, Valdebernardo and El Cañaveral. and the territory became part of the Casco Histórico de Vicálvaro neighborhood. The district formerly comprised only two neighborhoods: Ambroz and Casco Histórico de Vicálvaro (historic Vicálvaro)

The former municipality of Vicálvaro was absorbed into Madrid in 1951. Around its historic center are the nearby neighborhoods (known locally as poblados, colonias or barrios) of San Juan, Mil Viviendas, Las Cruces y Anillo Verde. Several of these cross the boundary between the two official barrios. West of the historic center of Vicálvaro, but entirely within the official barrio of Vicálvaro, is a second center at Valdebernardo, developed in the 1990s.

Finally, since 1998, Valderrivas has been developed on the land of a former cement factory operated 1923–1995 by Cementos Portland Valderrivas. This also falls within the official barrio of Vicálvaro. Portland moved their cement production to Morata de Tajuña because municipal ordinances raised increasing environmental issues. They sold their land, 40 percent of which was granted permits as being suitable for urban development; Portland also took charge of the ensuing construction. In the process, they tore down the chimney that had for decades been emblematic of Vicálvaro. Also in the Valderrivas area is a new neighborhood called La Catalana, near the border with of the Coslada district. La Catalana is mainly commercial.

Public Transport 
In the late 1990s, an extension of the Line 9 of the Metro Madrid from Pavones to Arganda del Rey was opened to the public, with passengers having to change trains at Puerta de Arganda station in order to continue their journey. Most characteristic for the new stations of Valdebernardo, Vicálvaro, San Cipriano and Puerta de Arganda are their distinctly coloured walls, an innovation aimed at making it less likely for passengers to accidentally miss their stop. Many subsequently constructed or renovated stations of the Metro system now use that same technique.

It is important to distinguish between the Metro Vicálvaro (situated in the centre of the Casco Histórico) and the train station Vicálvaro (situated above the Metro Puerta de Arganda).

Gallery

References

External links

 
Districts of Madrid